Domestic U.S. Air Mail was established as a new class of mail service by the United States Post Office Department (POD) on May 15, 1918, with the inauguration of the Washington–Philadelphia–New York route. Special postage stamps were issued for use with this service. Domestic air mail became obsolete in 1975, and international air mail in 1995, when the USPS began transporting First Class mail by air on a routine basis. All post-1977 United States stamp images are copyright of USPS.

Scott cataloged stamps received a "C" designation for airmail issues beginning in 1940.  Designated for international mail, and showing a small airplane, the January, 2012 $1.05 Scenic America series issue was designated C150.  However, with the January, 2013 issue of the $1.10 Global Forever Stamp no specific airmail purpose was shown in the design.  Rather, the Postal Service stated that this "stamp offers a single price for any First-Class Mail International 1-ounce letter to any country in the world." Thus a regular series Scott number, 4740, was designated.

1918–1919

| May 13, 1918 || 24¢ Rose & Blue || Inverted Curtis Jenny BiplaneDesign: Claire Aubrey HustonEngravers: J. Eissler and Edward M. Hall || 8493 T, 8493 B || see  || ~100 (1 plate) Error
|-
| May 13, 1918 || 24¢ Rose & Blue || Curtis Jenny BiplaneDesign: Claire Aubrey HustonEngravers: J. Eissler and Edward M. Hall || 8492 T, 8493 T ||  || 3,095,955
|-
| July 11, 1918 || 16¢ Green || Curtis Jenny BiplaneDesign: Claire Aubrey HustonEngravers: J. Eissler and Edward M. Hall || F8900 T ||  || 3,793,987
|-
| December 10, 1918 || 6¢ Orange || Curtis Jenny BiplaneDesign: Claire Aubrey HustonEngravers: J. Eissler and Edward M. Hall || 1955 T, Unused plate: 9164 ||  || 2,134,988
|}
Reference:

1920–1929

| August 15, 1923 || 8¢ Dark Green || De Havilland Airplane Propeller and RadiatorDesign: C. A. HustonEngraved: H. Dawson and E. M. Weeks || 14824–14827 L (four plates) ||  || 6,414,576
|-
| August 17, 1923 || 16¢ Dark Blue || U.S. Air Mail Service InsigniaDesign: C. A. HustonEngraved: H. Dawson and E. M. Hall || 14828-14831 L (four plates) ||  || 5,309,275
|-
| August 21, 1923 || 24¢ Carmine Rose  || De Havilland DH-4 BiplaneDesign: C. A. HustonEngraved: J. Eissler and E. M. Hall || 14840–14843 L (four plates) ||  || 5,285,775
|-
| February 13, 1926 || 10¢ Dark Blue || Map of the U.S. & two planesDesign: C. A. Huston || 18246 R, 18247 B ||  || more than 42,092,800
|-
| September 18, 1926 || 15¢ Olive Brown || Map of the U.S. & two planesDesign: C. A. Huston || 18746 L ||  || 15,597,307
|-
| January 25, 1927 || 20¢ Yellow Green || Map of the U.S. & two planesDesign: C. A. Huston || 18898 R, F18892 B ||  || 17,616,350
|-
| June 18, 1927 || 10¢ Dark Blue || Spirit of St. Louis || 18999 R, 19427 ||  || 20,379,179
|-
| July 25, 1928 || 5¢ Carmine & Blue || Beacon on Sherman HillDesign: A.R. Meissner || 19570 T, 19701 T (red)19546 T (blue) ||  || 106,887,675
|}
Reference:

1930–1939

| February 10, 1930 || 5¢ Violet || Winged GlobeDesign: Alvin R. Meissner || 19944 L ||  || 97,641,200
|-
| April 19, 1930 || 65¢ Green || Graf Zeppelin over the Atlantic || 20077 L ||  || 93,536 sold
|-
| April 19, 1930 || $1.30 Brown || Graf Zeppelin over the Atlantic || 20085 B ||  || 72,428 sold
|-
| April 19, 1930 || $2.60 Blue || Graf ZeppelinSee also: 1930 Graf Zeppelin stamps || 20092 R ||  || 61,296 sold
|-
| August 19, 1931 || 5¢ Violet || Winged GlobeDesign: Alvin R. Meissner || 20606 LL ||  || 57,340,050
|-
| September 26, 1932 || 8¢ Olive Bistre || Winged GlobeDesign: Alvin R. Meissner || 21030 UR ||  || 76,648,803
|-
| October 2, 1933 || 50¢ Green || Graf Zeppelin || 21172 B ||  || 324,070
|-
| June 30, 1934 || 6¢ Dull Orange || Winged GlobeDesign: Alvin R. Meissner || 22135 UL ||  || 302,205,100
|-
| August 30, 1934 || 16¢ Dark Blue || Great Seal of the U.S.(Air Mail Special Delivery) || 21313, 21313 F  – Reprinted imperforate, 1935||  || 9,215,750
|-
| November 22, 1935 || 25¢ Blue || China ClipperDesign: Alvin R. Meissner || 21473 ||  || 10,205,400
|-
| February 10, 1936 || 16¢ Carmine & Blue || Great Seal of the U.S.(Air Mail Special Delivery)  || 21497 F, 21495 F, 21493 ||  || 72,517,850
|-
| February 15, 1937 || 20¢ Green || China ClipperDesign: Alvin R. Meissner || 21622||  || 12,794,600
|-
| February 15, 1937 || 50¢ Carmine || China ClipperDesign: Alvin R. Meissner || 21624 ||   || 9,285,300
|-
| May 14, 1938 || 6¢ Carmine & Blue || Eagle and Shield || ||  || 349,946,500
|-
| May 16, 1939 || 30¢ Blue || Winged GlobeDesign: Alvin R. Meissner || F22384 T, 22381 ||  || 19,768,150
|}
Reference:

1940–1949

| June 25, 1941 || 6¢ Carmine(200 Subject Electric Eye Plates) || The Twin-Motored Transport Plane || Following are shared among the 1941 issues:40 plates between 22752-23349& 22756-9 (4 plates) ||  || 4,746,527,700
|-
| March 21, 1944 || 8¢ Olive Green(200 Subject Electric Eye Plates) || The Twin-Motored Transport Plane || 23126 ||  || 1,744,878,650
|-
| August 15, 1941 || 10¢ Violet(200 Subject Electric Eye Plates) || The Twin-Motored Transport Plane || ||  || 67,117,400
|-
| August 10, 1941 || 15¢ Brown(200 Subject Electric Eye Plates) || The Twin-Motored Transport Plane || ||  || 78,434,800
|-
| August 27, 1941 || 20¢ Green(200 Subject Electric Eye Plates) || The Twin-Motored Transport Plane || ||  || 42,359,850
|-
| September 25, 1941 || 30¢ Blue(200 Subject Electric Eye Plates) || The Twin-Motored Transport Plane || ||  || 59,880,850
|-
| October 29, 1941 || 50¢ Orange(200 Subject Electric Eye Plates) || The Twin-Motored Transport Plane || 22779 ||  || 11,160,600
|-
| September 26, 1946 || 5¢ Carmine || DC-4 Skymaster || 22778, 22779 ||  || 72,517,850
|-
| March 26, 1947 || 5¢ Carmine(400 Subject Electric Eye Plates) || DC-4 Skymaster || 23486, 23588, 23973, 25422 ||  || 971,903,700
|-
| August 30, 1947 || 10¢ Black(200 Subject Electric Eye Plates) || Martin 2-0-2 over Pan American Union Building, Wash. D.C. ||  23694 ||  || 207,976,550
|-
| August 20, 1947 || 15¢ Green(200 Subject Electric Eye Plates) || Lockheed Constellation over New York Skyline ||  23683 ||  || 756,186,350
|-
| July 30, 1947 || 25¢ Blue(200 Subject Electric Eye Plates) || Stratocruiser over the San Francisco Oakland Bay Bridge ||  25615 ||  || 132,956,100
|-
| January 15, 1948 || 5¢ Carmine || DC-4 Skymaster || ||  || 33,244,500
|-
| July 31, 1948 || 5¢ Red || New York City || 23846, 23851 ||  || 38,449,100
|-
| January 18, 1949 || 6¢ Carmine || DC-4 Skymaster || ||  || 5,070,095,200
|-
| May 11, 1948 || 6¢ Carmine || Alexandria Bicentennial || 24085 ||  || 75,085,000
|-
| August 25, 1949 || 6¢ Carmine || DC-4 Skymaster || ||  || 260,307,500
|-
| November 18, 1949 || 10¢ Violet || U.P.U. P.O. Building || ||  || 21,061,300
|-
| October 7, 1949 || 15¢ Ultramarine || U.P.U. Globe and Doves || ||  || 36,613,100
|-
| November 30, 1949 || 25¢ Rose || U.P.U. Boeing Stratocruiser || ||  || 16,217,100
|-
| December 17, 1949 || 6¢ Magenta || Wright Brothers || 24158 ||  || 80,405,000
|}
Reference:

1950–1959

| March 28, 1952 || 80¢ Red Violet || Diamond Head, Hawaii || 24592-4 (3 plate) ||  || 18,876,800
|-
| May 29, 1953 || 6¢ Carmine || 50 Years of Powered Flight || || 
|-
| September 9, 1954 || 4¢ Blue || Eagle || 25034-35, 40–41 (4 plate) || 
|-
| August 1, 1957 || 6¢ Blue || U.S. Air Force, 50th Anniversary || 25763 || 
|-
| July 31, 1958 || 5¢ Red || Eagle || 26052 || 
|-
| July 31, 1958 || 7¢ Blue || Jet Silhouette || 26046 || 
|-
| July 31, 1958 || 7¢ Blue || Jet Silhouette ||  – small holes || 
|-
| January 3, 1959 || 7¢ Blue || Alaska Statehood || 26225 || 
|-
| August 17, 1959 || 7¢ Red & Blue || Jupiter Balloon || 26392 || 
|-
| August 21, 1959 || 7¢ Rose || Hawaii Statehood || 26432 || 
|-
| August 27, 1959 || 10¢ Blue & Red || Pan Am Games || 26413 || 
|-
| November 20, 1959 || 15¢ Orange & Black || Statue of Liberty || 26482 || 
|}

1960–1969

| June 10, 1960 || 10¢ Green & Black || Liberty BellNumber issued: 39,960,000 || 26630 || 
|-
| April 22, 1960 || 25¢ Maroon & Black || Abraham Lincoln || 26563 || 
|-
| August 12, 1960 || 7¢ Red || Jet Silhouette || 26714 || 
|-
| October 22, 1960 || 7¢ Red || Jet Silhouette || || 
|-
| June 28, 1961 || 13¢ Red & Black || Liberty Bell || 26970 || 
|-
| January 13, 1961 || 15¢ Orange & Black || Statue of Liberty || 26878 || 
|-
| December 5, 1962 || 8¢ Red400 Subjects || Jetliner Over Capitol Building || – Booklet Pane of 5 + Label28024 || 
|-
| December 5, 1962 || 8¢ Red(Perforated 10 Horizontally) || Jetliner Over Capitol Building || || 
|-
| May 3, 1963 || 15¢ Red, Brown & Blue || Montgomery BlairNumber issued: 42,245,000Design: Robert J. Jones || 27466 || 
|-
| July 12, 1963 || 6¢ Red || EagleDesign: V. S. McCloskey || 27390 || 
|-
| July 24, 1963 || 8¢ Carmine & Maroon || Amelia EarhartNumber issued: 63,890,000Design: Robert J. Jones || 27548 || 
|-
| October 5, 1964 || 8¢ Blue & Red || Robert GoddardNumber issued: 62,255,000 || 27861 || 
|-
| March 30, 1967 || 8¢ Brown || Alaska PurchaseNumber issued: 55,710,000  || 29013 || 
|-
| April 26, 1967 || 20¢ Multicolored || Audubon "Columbia Jays"Number issued: more than 50 million || 29087 || 
|-
| January 5, 1968 || 10¢ Red || Runway || 29518 || 
|-
| January 5, 1968 || 10¢ Red || Runway || || 
|-
| April 4, 1968 || $1 Multicolored || Airlift || || 
|-
| May 15, 1968 || 10¢ Red, Blue & Black || 50th Anniversary of Air Mail || 29673 || 
|-
| November 22, 1968 || 20¢ Red, Black & Blue || Jet & "USA" || 30510 || 
|-
| September 9, 1969 || 10¢ Multicolored || Moon LandingNumber issued: 152,364,800Design: Paul Calle ||  – red omitted – tagging omitted31378 || 
|}

1970–1979

| May 15, 1971 || 9¢ Red || Jet Silhouette || 32946 || 
|-
| May 7, 1971 || 11¢ Red || Jet Silhouette || 33020 || 
|-
| November 10, 1973 || 13¢ Red || Winged Letter || 34584 || 
|-
| July 13, 1971 || 17¢ Red, Green & Black || Statue of Liberty || 33096 || 
|-
| May 21, 1971 || 21¢ Red & Blue || USA || 33279 || 
|-
| May 7, 1971 || 11¢ Red || Jet Silhouette || || 
|-
| December 27, 1973 || 13¢ Red || Winged Letter || || 
|-
| May 3, 1972 || 11¢ Multicolored || City of Refuge || 33463 || 
|-
| August 17, 1972 || 11¢ Blue, Black, Green, Red & Yellow || Winter Olympics, Sapporo, Skiing || 33322-6 || 
|-
| July 10, 1973 || 11¢ Multicolored || Progress in Electronics || 34192 || 
|-
| January 11, 1974 || 18¢ Black, Red & Blue || Statue of Liberty || 34931, 34959 || 
|-
| January 2, 1974 || 26¢ Black, Red & Blue || Mount Rushmore || 34875 || 
|-
| January 2, 1976 || 25¢ Red, Black & Blue || Plane & Globes || 36957 || 
|-
| January 2, 1976 || 31¢ Red, Black & Blue || Plane & Globes || 36981 || 
|-
| September 23, 1978 || 31¢ Multicolored || Wright Brothers ||   ||  
|-
| September 23, 1978 || 31¢ Multicolored || Wright Brothers ||  ||  
|-
| March 29, 1979 || 21¢ Multicolored || Octave Chanute || 38856 || 
|-
| March 29, 1979 || 21¢ Multicolored || Octave Chanute ||  || 
|-
| November 20, 1979 || 25¢ Multicolored || Wiley Post || 39197 || 
|-
| November 20, 1979 || 25¢ Multicolored || Wiley Post ||  || 
|-
| November 1, 1979 || 31¢ Multicolored || Olympics || || 
|}

1980–1989

| October 13, 1980 || 40¢ Multicolored || Philip Mazzei ||  (1980) – perf 10 1/2x11 1/2 || 
|-
| December 30, 1980 || 28¢ Multicolored || Blanche Stuart Scott || || 
|-
| December 30, 1980 || 35¢ Multicolored || Glenn Curtiss || || 
|-
| June 17, 1983 || 28¢ Multicolored || Olympics || || 
|-
| June 17, 1983 || 28¢ Multicolored || Olympics || || 
|-
| June 17, 1983 || 28¢ Multicolored || Olympics || || 
|-`
| June 17, 1983 || 28¢ Multicolored || Olympics || || 
|-
| April 8, 1983 || 40¢ Multicolored || Olympics ||  – block || 
|-
| April 8, 1983 || 40¢ Multicolored || Olympics ||  – block || 
|-
| April 8, 1983 || 40¢ Multicolored || Olympics ||  – block || 
|-
| April 8, 1983 || 40¢ Multicolored || Olympics ||  – block || 
|-
| November 4, 1983 || 35¢ Multicolored || Olympics || || 
|-
| November 4, 1983 || 35¢ Multicolored || Olympics || || 
|-
| November 4, 1983 || 35¢ Multicolored || Olympics ||  || 
|-
| November 4, 1983 || 35¢ Multicolored || Olympics || || 
|-
| February 13, 1985 || 33¢ Multicolored || Alfred V. Verville || || 
|-
| February 13, 1985 || 39¢ Multicolored || Lawrence and Elmer Sperry || || 
|-
| June 10, 1985 || 44¢ Multicolored || Transpacific 50th Anniversary || || 
|-
| August 22, 1985 || 44¢ Multicolored || Junipero Serra || || 
|-
| March 29, 1988 || 44¢ Multicolored || New Sweden Settling || || 
|-
| July 14, 1988 || 45¢ Multicolored || Samuel P. Langley ||  – overall tagging || 
|-
| June 23, 1988 || 36¢ Multicolored || Igor Sikorsky || || 
|-
| July 14, 1989 || 45¢ Multicolored || French Revolution || || 
|-
| October 12, 1989 || 45¢ Multicolored || Pre-Columbian America || || 
|-
| November 27, 1989 || 45¢ Multicolored || Future Mail Delivery || || 
|-
| November 27, 1989 || 45¢ Multicolored || Future Mail Delivery || || 
|-
| November 27, 1989 || 45¢ Multicolored || Future Mail Delivery || || 
|-
| November 27, 1989 || 45¢ Multicolored || Future Mail Delivery || || 
|-
| November 24, 1989 || $1.80 Multicolored || Future Mail Delivery Miniature sheet|| || 
|}

1990–2012

| October 12, 1990 || 45¢ Multicolored || Tropical Coast || A1111 UL || 
|-
| April 27, 1991 || 50¢ Multicolored || Harriet Quimby || S1111 LL – Perf 11.2S2222 LR || 
|-
| May 17, 1991 || 40¢ Multicolored || William T. Piper || A1111 UL || 
|-
| June 21, 1991 || 50¢ Multicolored || Antarctic Treaty || S1111 UR || 
|-
| October 12, 1991 || 50¢ Multicolored || Bering Land Bridge || 111111 LR || 
|-
| 1993 || 40¢ Multicolored || William T. Piper || S1111 LR || 
|-
| May 12, 1999 || 48¢ Multicolored || Niagara Falls || V11111 UL (First of the Scenic American Landscapes Series)|| 
|-
| July 30, 1999 || 40¢ Multicolored || Rio Grande || V11111 LR || 
|-
| January 20, 2000 || 60¢ Multicolored || Grand Canyon || B1111 UR – die cutting omitted errorB1111 UR || 
|-
| March 6, 2001 || 70¢ Multicolored || Nine-Mile Prairie || P11111 LL || 
|-
| April 17, 2001 || 80¢ Multicolored || Mount McKinley || V11111 UL || 
|-
| May 20, 2001 || 60¢ Multicolored || Acadia National Park ||  – 2001 year date, prephosphored, die cut 11.25 x 11.5 (B1111 UR) – 2001 year date, overall tagging, die cut 11.5 x 11.9 (B2222 UR) – 2005 year date (S1111 UR) – Acadia error,  printed on the backing paper (S1111 LR) || 
|-
| February 22, 2006 || 63¢ Multicolored || Bryce Canyon, Utah || S22222 LL || 
|-
| February 22, 2006 || 75¢ Multicolored || Great Smoky Mountains || P11111 LR || 
|-
| February 22, 2006 || 84¢ Multicolored || Yosemite National Park || V11111 UR || 
|-
| June 1, 2007 || 69¢ Multicolored || Okefenokee Swamp National Wildlife Refuge || P11111 LL || 
|-
| June 1, 2007 || 90¢ Multicolored || Hagatña Bay, Guam || V11111 UR || 
|-
| May 16, 2008 || 72¢ Multicolored || 13-Mile Woods, New Hampshire || S11111 UL || 
|-
| May 16, 2008 || 94¢ Multicolored || St. John, U.S. Virgin Islands || V11111 LL || 
|-
| June 28, 2009 || 79¢ Multicolored || Zion National Park || || 
|-
| June 28, 2009 || 98¢ Multicolored || Grand Teton National Park || || 
|-
| April 11, 2011 || 80¢ Multicolored || Voyageurs National Park || || 
|-
| January 19, 2012 || 85¢ Multicolored || Glacier National Park || || 
|-
| January 20, 2012 || $1.05 Multicolored || Lancaster County, Pennsylvania || ||
|}

Notes on types

See also

Airmails of the United States
 1930 Graf Zeppelin stamps

References

Airmail

Airmail stamps
United States airmail stamps